The South African Super League, is a South African ice hockey league that was founded in 2016.

Teams

Super League seasons

Past champions
 2016 Kempton Park Wildcats
 2017 Kempton Park Wildcats
 2018 Season not played
 2019 Cape Town Kings
 2020 Cancelled due to Covid-19 Pandemic
 2021 Cancelled due to Covid-19 Pandemic

References

External links
South Africa at IIHF.com
WPIHA at wpicehockey.co.za

Ice hockey governing bodies in Africa
Ice hockey in South Africa
International Ice Hockey Federation members
Ice
2016 establishments in South Africa
Sports leagues established in 2016